André Jourdain (13 June 1935 - 16 September 2019) was a French politician.

Jourdain was the Senator for Jura from 1989 to 2001. He was the Mayor of Sapois, Jura between 2001 and 2014.

References

External links
André Jourdain Senate biography

1935 births
2019 deaths
Mayors of places in Bourgogne-Franche-Comté
French Senators of the Fifth Republic